Choi Mi-seon (born 30 March 1980) is a South Korean gymnast. She competed at the 2000 Summer Olympics.

References

External links
 

1980 births
Living people
South Korean female artistic gymnasts
Olympic gymnasts of South Korea
Gymnasts at the 2000 Summer Olympics
People from Yongin
Sportspeople from Gyeonggi Province
21st-century South Korean women